Adarnase IV may refer to:

Adarnase IV of Iberia (died 923)
 Adarnase V of Tao (died 961)